The Battle of Shevchenkove was the second battle of the Ukrainian Kharkiv counteroffensive that began on September 7, 2022.

Background 
During the early days of the 2022 Russian invasion of Ukraine, Russian forces captured much of eastern Kharkiv Oblast, including the towns of Kupiansk, Shevchenkove, and Balakliia. Balakliia itself was captured on March 3, 2022, without much of a fight. From March to early May, most of the fighting in Kharkiv Oblast was concentrated in the cities of Kharkiv and Izium.

In early April, Russian forces captured Izium, and Ukrainian forces successfully defended Kharkiv by early May. After that, the frontline began to stagnate as Russia and Ukraine focused their efforts on the cities of Sievierodonetsk, Lysychansk and the wider Donbas region.

Throughout July and August 2022, Ukrainian and Russian media both amplified claims of a Ukrainian counteroffensive in Kherson Oblast, which finally culminated on August 29, 2022. The counteroffensive saw slow progress, with Ukrainian forces suffering heavy losses and facing a stiff Russian resistance. However, on September 6, Ukrainian forces launched a surprise counteroffensive in eastern Kharkiv oblast, with fighting for Balakliia beginning on the first day.

Battle 
By September 7, Balakliia was under siege, with fighting taking place in the eastern and central parts of the city. Fighting ended on September 8, with Ukrainian forces capturing all of Balakliia. After the quick takeover of the town of Balakliia, on the same day, Ukrainian troops took over the place of Shevchenkove in a blitzkrieg. Russian forces retreated in panic towards the city of Kupiansk, while much larger Ukrainian forces continued the offensive in the direction of Izyum and Kupiansk on the same day.

Aftermath 

During the days after the battle, Ukrainian forces liberated Kupiansk on September 9, Izium on September 10, and Velykyi Burluk and Vovchansk on September 12. The counteroffensive stalled after September 12, as news teams, Ukrposhta, and other organizations were let into eastern Kharkiv oblast.

See also

 2022 Ukrainian Kharkiv counteroffensive
 Battle of Balakliia
 Russian occupation of Kharkiv Oblast
 Battle of Kharkiv (2022)

References

September 2022 events in Ukraine
History of Kharkiv Oblast
S
Eastern Ukraine offensive